The United States Board on Geographic Names (BGN) is a federal body operating under the United States Secretary of the Interior. The purpose of the board is to establish and maintain uniform usage of geographic names throughout the federal government of the United States.

History
On January 8, 1890, Thomas Corwin Mendenhall, superintendent of the US Coast and Geodetic Survey Office, wrote to 10 noted geographers "to suggest the organization of a Board made up of representatives from the different Government services interested, to which may be referred any disputed question of geographical orthography." President Benjamin Harrison signed executive order 28 on September 4, 1890, establishing the Board on Geographical Names. "To this Board shall be referred all unsettled questions concerning geographic names. The decisions of the Board are to be accepted [by federal departments] as the standard authority for such matters." The board was given authority to resolve all unsettled questions concerning geographic names. Decisions of the board were accepted as binding by all departments and agencies of the federal government.

The board has since undergone several name changes. In 1934, it was transferred to the Department of the Interior.

The Advisory Committee on Antarctic Names was established in 1943 as the Special Committee on Antarctic Names (SCAN). In 1963, the Advisory Committee on Undersea Features was started for standardization of names of undersea features.

Its present form derives from a 1947 law, Public Law 80-242.

Operation 
The 1969 BGN publication Decisions on Geographic Names in the United States stated the agency's chief purpose as:

The board has developed principles, policies, and procedures governing the use of domestic and foreign geographic names, including underseas. The BGN also deals with names of geographical features in Antarctica via its Advisory Committee on Antarctic Names.

The Geographic Names Information System, developed by the BGN in cooperation with the US Geological Survey, includes topographic map names and bibliographic references. The names of books and historic maps which confirm the feature or place name are cited. Variant names, alternatives to official federal names for a feature, are also recorded.

The BGN has members from six federal departments as well as the Central Intelligence Agency, the US Government Publishing Office, the Library of Congress, and the US Postal Service. The BGN rules on hundreds of naming decisions annually and stores over two million geographical records in its databases at geonames.usgs.gov. State and local governments, and private mapping organizations, usually follow the BGN's decisions.

The BGN has an executive committee and two permanent committees with full authority: the 10- to 15-member Domestic Names Committee and the 8- to 10-member Foreign Names Committee. Both comprise government employees only. Each maintains its own database.

The BGN does not create place names but responds to proposals for names from federal agencies; state, local, and tribal governments; and the public. Any person or organization, public or private, may make inquiries or request the board to render formal decisions on proposed new names, proposed name changes, or names that are in conflict. Generally, the BGN defers federal name use to comply with local usage. There are a few exceptions. For example, in rare cases where a locally used name is very offensive, the BGN may decide against adoption of the local name for federal use.

Special situations 

The BGN does not translate terms, but instead accurately uses foreign names in the Roman alphabet. For non-Roman languages, the BGN uses transliteration systems or creates them for less well-known languages.

The BGN does not recognize the use of the possessive apostrophe and has only granted an exception five times during its history, including one for Martha's Vineyard, Massachusetts.

In federal mapping and names collection efforts, there is often a phase lag where a delay occurs in adoption of a locally used name. Sometimes the delay is several decades. Volunteers in the Earth Science Corps are used to assist the US Geological Survey in collecting names of geographic features.

Other authorities 
 The United States Census Bureau defines census designated places, which are a subset of locations in the Geographic Names Information System. 
 The names of post offices have historically been used to back up claims about the name of a community. US Postal Service Publication 28 gives standards for addressing mail. In this publication, the Postal Service defines two-letter state abbreviations, street identifiers such as boulevard (BLVD) and street (ST), and secondary identifiers such as suite (STE).

Publications
The BGN currently publishes names on its website. In the past, the BGN issued its decisions in various publications under different titles at different intervals with various information included. In 1933, the BGN published a significant consolidated report of all decisions from 1890 to 1932 in its Sixth Report of the United States Geographic Board 1890–1932. For many years, the BGN published a quarterly report under the title Decisions on Geographic Names.

See also

 BGN/PCGN romanization, a system for rendering geographic names in other writing systems into the Latin alphabet
 Composite Gazetteer of Antarctica
 Denali–Mount McKinley naming dispute
 Name of Pittsburgh
 Henry Gannett, "Father of the Quadrangle Map"
 Geographical Names Board of Canada
 Geographical Names Board of New South Wales
BGN/PCGN romanization systems
NGA Geographic Names Server

References

Footnotes

Bibliography
U.S. Department of the Interior, U.S. Geological Survey, National Mapping Division, Digital Gazetteer: Users Manual, (Reston, Virginia: U.S. Geological Survey, 1994).
Report: "Countries, Dependencies, Areas Of Special Sovereignty, And Their Principal Administrative Divisions", Federal Information Processing Standards, FIPS 10-4.
Report: "Principles, Policies, and Procedures: Domestic Geographic Names", U.S. Board of Geographic Names, 1997.
U.S. Postal Service Publication 28, November 2000.

External links
 

Names of places in Antarctica
Board on Geographic Names
Board on Geographic Names
Geocodes
Geographical naming agencies
Board on Geographic Names
Board on Geographic Names
1890 establishments in the United States